Paratelphusa reducta is a moth in the family Gelechiidae. It was described by Anthonie Johannes Theodorus Janse in 1958. It is found in Namibia.

References

Endemic fauna of Namibia
Gelechiinae
Moths described in 1958